Fuyuko (written: 冬子 lit. "winter child" or 芙由子) is a feminine Japanese given name. Notable people with the name include:

, Japanese writer
, Japanese painter
, Japanese biathlete

Japanese feminine given names